Angel Martin may refer to:

 Ángel Martín (actor) (born 1977), Spanish actor, TV presenter, comedian and screenwriter
 Ángel Martín (footballer, born 1978), Andorran football midfielder
 Ángel Martín González (born 1964), Spanish football defensive midfielder
 Ángel Martín González (chess player) (born 1953), Spanish chess player
Angel Martín Taboas (born 1918), Puerto Rican jurist
 Evelyn "Angel" Martin, a fictional character played by Stuart Margolin on The Rockford Files